A freshman, fresher, first year, or frosh, is a person in the first year at an educational institution, usually a secondary school or at the college and university level, but also in other forms of post-secondary educational institutions.

Arab world
In much of the Arab world, a first-year is called a "Ebtidae" (Pl. Mubtadeen), which is Arabic for "beginner".

Brazil
In Brazil, students that pass the vestibulares and begin studying in a college or university are called "calouros" or more informally "bixos" ("bixetes" for girls), an alternate spelling of "bicho", which means "animal" (although commonly used to refer to bugs). Calouros are often subject to hazing, which is known as "trote" (lit. "prank") there. The first known hazing episode in Brazil happened in 1831 at the Law School of Olinda and resulted in the death of a student. In 1999, a Chinese Brazilian calouro of the University of São Paulo Medicine School named Edison Tsung Chi Hsueh was found dead at the institution's swimming pool; this has since become one of the most well known episodes of violent hazing and has received extensive national media coverage since that year.

Canada
The term 'first year' or 'frosh' is used for a first-year student at university or college.

East Asia
Some East Asian countries use the same names as used in the United States (freshman, sophomore, junior, senior), among them Malaysia.

Germany
In Germany, a first-semester student of a university program (Bachelor, Master, State exam etc) is called Erstsemester, or in short and more common, Ersti, with "erst" meaning first and the -i adding a benevolently diminutive tone. The plural is Erstis.

It's worth noting that unlike the word freshman, which stands for a student in their whole first year, the German word Ersti is exclusively used for students in their first semester. Students of higher semesters are accordingly called Zweitsemester, Drittsemester, Viertsemester etc. and sometimes, but rarely, also Zweitis, Drittis, Viertis, etc. for fun.

United Kingdom

England and Wales

Students in their first year of university are often known in England and Wales  as freshers; however, first years is more common. The first week of term is widely known as freshers' week where there are usually no classes and students take part in induction events and fairs.

Unlike in Scotland, this term is not used in reference to pre-university education, the equivalent terms being Year sevens for the first year of secondary school and first years, lower sixers and Year Twelves used at sixth forms.

Scotland
First year (also known as S1 in Scotland) is the first year of schooling in secondary schools in Scotland and is roughly equivalent to Year 8 (Second Form) in England and Wales and Year 9 (Second Form) in Northern Ireland. Most pupils are 12 or 13 years old at the end of S1.

The first year of primary education in Scotland is known as Primary 1 (P1).

At the four ancient Scottish universities the traditional names for the four years at university are Bejan ("Bejant" at the University of St Andrews) (1st), Semi (2nd), Tertian (3rd) and Magistrand (4th), though all Scottish universities will have a "freshers' week" (as with all British universities) and the term is as widely used with more traditional terms.

United States

Beginner

Freshman is commonly in use as a US English idiomatic term to describe a beginner or novice, someone who is naive, a first effort, instance, or a student in the first year of study (generally referring to high school or university study).

First Year Congressional representatives

New members of Congress in their first term are referred to as freshmen senators or freshmen congressmen or congresswomen, no matter how experienced they were in previous government positions.

First year high school students

High school first year students are almost exclusively referred to as freshmen, or in some cases by their grade year, 9th graders. Second year students are sophomores, or 10th graders, then juniors or 11th graders, and finally seniors or 12th graders.

First year university students

At college or university, freshman denotes students in their first year of study. The grade designations of high school are not used, but the terms sophomore, junior, and senior are kept at most schools. Some colleges, including historically women's colleges, do not use the term freshman but use first year, instead. Beyond the fourth year, students are simply classified as fifth year, sixth year, etc.  Some institutions use the term freshman for specific reporting purposes.

See also
 Freshman fifteen 
 Sophomore
 Junior (education year)
 Senior (education)
 Hazing

References

External links 

 https://www.makemoneyforsure.com/

Educational stages
Educational years
Types of students
Beginners and newcomers